Boyd Gordon (born October 19, 1983) is a Canadian former professional ice hockey centre who played 13 seasons in the National Hockey League (NHL) for the Washington Capitals, Arizona Coyotes, Edmonton Oilers, and Philadelphia Flyers.

Playing career
Gordon was drafted in the 1st round, 17th overall by the Washington Capitals in the 2002 NHL Entry Draft. Gordon was drafted from the Red Deer Rebels of the Western Hockey League where he helped the Red Deer Rebels win the Memorial Cup in the 2000–01 season. Gordon played his first professional season in 2003–04. He played with Capitals affiliate, the Portland Pirates, of the AHL and also made his NHL debut with the Capitals appearing in 41 games.
 
In the 2005–06 season, Gordon won the Calder Cup with the Hershey Bears before earning a regular roster spot with the Capitals in the 2006–07 season.

He signed a two-year contract with the Phoenix Coyotes on July 1, 2011.

On July 5, 2013, he signed a three-year contract as a free agent with the Edmonton Oilers.

Approaching the final year of his contract with the Oilers, Gordon was traded in a return to the Coyotes organization in exchange for Lauri Korpikoski on June 30, 2015.

On July 1, 2016, Gordon signed a one-year contract worth $950,000 with the Philadelphia Flyers.

Career statistics

Regular season and playoffs

International

Awards and honours

References

External links

 

1983 births
Arizona Coyotes players
Canadian ice hockey centres
Edmonton Oilers players
Hershey Bears players
Ice hockey people from Saskatchewan
Lehigh Valley Phantoms players
Living people
National Hockey League first-round draft picks
People from Unity, Saskatchewan
Philadelphia Flyers players
Phoenix Coyotes players
Portland Pirates players
Red Deer Rebels players
Washington Capitals draft picks
Washington Capitals players